Eve Beglarian (born Ann Arbor, Michigan, U.S., July 22, 1958) is a contemporary American composer, performer and audio producer of Armenian descent.  Her music is often characterized as postminimalist.

Her chamber, choral, and orchestral music has been commissioned and widely performed by The Los Angeles Master Chorale, the Bang on a Can All-Stars, The Chamber Music Society of Lincoln Center, The California EAR Unit, The Orchestra of St. Luke's, Relâche, The Paul Dresher Ensemble, Sequitur, and The American Composers Orchestra, among many others.  She received a Foundation for Contemporary Arts Robert Rauschenberg Award (2015).

Discography

Albums
Overstepping (1998)
Tell the Birds (2006)

Collaborations
Dream Cum Go Down - Eve Beglarian and Juliana Luecking (1995)
Dancing in Place - Elizabeth Panzer (1999)
Play Nice - Twisted Tutu (1999)
Almost Human (Beiser) - Maya Beiser (2007)

Compilations 

Lesbian American Composers (1998)
Emergency Music (1998)
Messiah Remix (2004)
To Have and to Hold (2007)
60x60 (2004-2005) (2007)

References

External links
Composer Finds a Muse in the Mississippi (The New York Times)
EVBVD Music: Eve Beglarian
Recommended composers: Eve Beglarian  by Kyle Gann
Podcast interview on MikeyPod

1958 births
21st-century American composers
21st-century American women musicians
20th-century American composers
20th-century American women musicians
20th-century American musicians
20th-century classical composers
20th-century women composers
21st-century classical composers
21st-century women composers
American classical composers
American people of Armenian descent
American contemporary classical composers
American women classical composers
American women in electronic music
Classical musicians from Michigan
American lesbian musicians
LGBT classical composers
LGBT people from Michigan
Armenian LGBT people
Living people
Musicians from Ann Arbor, Michigan
20th-century American LGBT people
21st-century American LGBT people